Yuri Anatolyevich Kurnenin (14 June 1954 – 30 July 2009) was a Belarusian professional football player and coach of Russian origin. As a player, he made his professional debut in the Soviet Top League in 1973 for FC Dynamo Moscow.

To date, he remains the only Belarusian manager to have coached a national team in a major competition, when he coached Syria in the 1996 AFC Asian Cup.

Honours
 Soviet Top League champion: 1982.
 Soviet Top League bronze: 1973, 1975, 1983.
 Soviet Cup finalist: 1987.

European club competitions
 UEFA Cup 1974–75 with FC Dynamo Moscow: 1 game, 1 goal.
 European Cup 1983–84 with FC Dinamo Minsk: 6 games, 2 goals.
 UEFA Cup 1984–85 with FC Dinamo Minsk: 6 games.
 UEFA Cup 1986–87 with FC Dinamo Minsk: 2 games.

References

1954 births
People from Orekhovo-Zuyevo
2009 deaths
Belarusian people of Russian descent
Russian footballers
Soviet footballers
Belarusian footballers
Association football defenders
Soviet Top League players
FC Dynamo Moscow players
FC Dinamo Minsk players
Belarusian football managers
Belarusian expatriate football managers
Expatriate football managers in Syria
FC Dynamo Brest managers
Syria national football team managers
FC Dinamo Minsk managers
1996 AFC Asian Cup managers
Sportspeople from Moscow Oblast